Herbert Prohaska (born 8 August 1955) is an Austrian former professional footballer. He ranks among Austria's greatest football players of all time. Prohaska works as a football pundit for the Austrian Broadcasting Corporation (ORF). His nickname "Schneckerl", Viennese dialect for curly hair, derives from his curly haircut in his younger years. A talented, elegant, and combative midfielder, Prohaska played as a deep-lying playmaker, and was known for his technique, intelligence, and precise passing.

Club career
Born in Vienna, Austria, Prohaska started his professional career in 1972 at the football club Austria Vienna. By 1980 he had helped his club to win four Austrian league titles and three Austrian Cup wins. In 1980, he joined Inter Milan, and won the Italian Cup in his second season with the nerazzurri. In 1982, he moved to A.S. Roma, where he won the Italian championship in his first year. He returned to Austria Vienna in 1983 to finish his playing career.

International career
Prohaska made his debut for Austria in a November 1974 friendly match against Turkey and was a participant at the 1978 and 1982 FIFA World Cups. He earned 83 caps, scoring 10 goals. His final international was a June 1989 World Cup qualification match against Iceland, but he retired before the 1990 World Cup, while Austria qualified for the tournament.

Managerial career
In 1989 Prohaska retired from playing. Shortly after his retirement he worked as a coach at Austria Vienna, where he won two Austrian League titles and two Austrian Cups.

In 1993, he became manager of the Austria national team, qualifying as group winners for the 1998 World Cup in France. In 1999, he resigned after a disastrous 9–0 defeat to Spain. From 1999 to 2000 he returned to managing Austria Vienna.

Awards
In November 2003, Prohaska was selected as the Golden Player of Austria by the Austrian Football Association as their most outstanding player of the past 50 years. In August 2004, he was voted the Austrian Footballer of the Century as the Austrian Football Association celebrated its 100th anniversary.

Media work
Working as a pundit for the Austrian Broadcasting Corporation ORF, Prohaska suggested at the 2006 World Cup that referee Graham Poll's famous yellow card blunder was a result of heavy alcohol consumption before the match.

Honours

As a player
 Austrian Bundesliga (7): 1976, 1978, 1979, 1980, 1984, 1985, 1986
 Austrian Cup: 1974, 1977, 1980, 1986
 Italian Serie A Championship: 1983
 Italian Cup: 1982

Individual
 Austrian Player of the Year (Krone-Fußballerwahl): 1975, 1985
 Austrian Player of the Year (APA-Fußballerwahl): 1984, 1985, 1988
 UEFA Jubilee Awards (Austria's Golden Player): 2004

As a manager
 Austrian Bundesliga: 1991, 1992
 Austrian Cup: 1990, 1992
 Austrian Manager of the Year (Krone-Fußballerwahl): 1997

References

External links
 Player profile – Herbert Prohaska Austria Archive
 

1955 births
Living people
Footballers from Vienna
Austrian footballers
Association football midfielders
Austria international footballers
UEFA Golden Players
1978 FIFA World Cup players
1982 FIFA World Cup players
Austrian Football Bundesliga players
Serie A players
FK Austria Wien players
Inter Milan players
A.S. Roma players
Austrian football managers
1998 FIFA World Cup managers
Austria national football team managers
FK Austria Wien managers
Austrian expatriate footballers
Austrian expatriate sportspeople in Italy
Expatriate footballers in Italy
Recipients of the Decoration of Honour for Services to the Republic of Austria